Gedeo is a zone in the Southern Nations, Nationalities, and Peoples' Region of Ethiopia. This zone is named for the Gedeo people, whose homelands lie in this zone. Gedeo is an exclave of the SNNPR consisting of a narrow strip of land along the eastern escarpment of the Ethiopian Highlands. It is surrounded by the Oromia Region, which borders the Zone on the east, south and west; Gedeo shares its northern boundary with the Sidama Region. Dilla is the administrative center; other towns include Dilla, Wonago, Yirgachefe, Chelelekitu and Gedeb.

Overview 
The altitude of the Zone ranges from 1268 meters above sea level in the vicinity of Lake Abaya to an elevation of 2993 meters at Haro Wolabu Pond. Gedeo has 215 kilometers of all-weather roads and 54 kilometers of dry-weather roads, for an average road density of 199 kilometers per 1000 square kilometers.

The Central Statistical Agency (CSA) reported that 63,562 tons of coffee were produced in Sidama and Gedeo combined in the year ending in 2005, based on inspection records from the Ethiopian Coffee and Tea authority. This represents 63% of the SNNPR's output and 28% of Ethiopia's total output. On 28 July 2009, the Zonal agriculture and rural development coordination department  in Dila reported that over 359.2 million Birr of coffee had been produced by farmers in the Gedeo Zone over the course of the year.

Demographics 
The 2007 Census conducted by the Central Statistical Agency of Ethiopia reports this Zone has a total population of 847,434, of whom 424,742 are men and 422,692 women; with an area of 1,210.89 square kilometers, Gedeo has a population density of 699.84. While 107,781 or 12.72% are urban inhabitants, a further 39 individuals are pastoralists. A total of 179,677 households were counted in this Zone, which results in an average of 4.72 persons to a household, and 172,782 housing units. The four largest ethnic groups reported in this Zone were the Gedeo (86.14%), the Oromo (4.71%), the Amhara (3.37%) and the Gurage (1.55%); all other ethnic groups made up 4.23% of the population. Gedeo is spoken as a first language by 86.82%, 5.82% speak Amharic and 4.12% speak Oromiffa; the remaining 3.24% spoke all other primary languages reported. A majority of the inhabitants said they were Protestants, with 73.21% of the population reporting answers in that category, while 10.67% practiced Ethiopian Orthodox Christianity, 7.96% observed traditional religions, 2.44% were Muslim, and 2.11% embraced Catholicism.

In the 1994 Census, Gedeo had a population of 564,073 in 124,874 households, of whom 282,595 were men and 281,478 women; 65,374 or 11.59% of its population were urban dwellers. The five largest ethnic groups reported in this Zone were the Gedeo (81.21%), the Oromo (8.33%), the Amhara (4.35%), the Sidama (1.15%) and the Silt'e (1.11%); all other ethnic groups made up 3.85% of the population. Gedeuffa is spoken as a first language by 81.45%, 7.79% speak Oromiffa, 7.64% Amharic, and 1.1% speak Sidamo; the remaining 2.02% spoke all other primary languages reported. A plurality of the inhabitants said they were Protestants, with 43.24% of the population reporting answers in that category, while 24.57% observed traditional religions, 22.1% practiced Ethiopian Orthodox Christianity, 2.84% embraced Catholicism, and 2.77% were Muslim. 

According to a May 24, 2004 World Bank memorandum, 11% of the inhabitants of Gedeo have access to electricity, this zone has a road density of 231.7 kilometers per 1000 square kilometers (compared to the national average of 30 kilometers), the average rural household has 0.3 hectare of land (compared to the national average of 1.01 hectare of land and an average of 0.89 for the SNNPR) and the equivalent of 0.2 heads of livestock. 19.6% of the population is in non-farm related jobs, compared to the national average of 25% and a Regional average of 32%. 65% of all eligible children are enrolled in primary school, and 17% in secondary schools. 40% of the zone is exposed to malaria, and 37% to Tsetse fly. The memorandum gave this zone a drought risk rating of 342.

Woredas 
Woredas of Gedeo Zone are:
 Bule woreda
 Dila Town
 Dila Zuria woreda
 Gedeb woreda
 Kochere woreda
 Wenago woreda
 Yirgachefe Town
 Yirgachefe woreda
 Raphe woreda
 Chorso woreda 

 Chelelekitu Administrative town
 Gedeb Administrative town
 Wonago Administrative town

Notes

External links
Five thousand years of sustainability? A case study on Gedeo land use. PhD dissertation by Kippie Kanshie, T. May 2002. , Treemail publishers, 295 pp, 20 pages of color illustrations.

Southern Nations, Nationalities, and Peoples' Region
Zones of Ethiopia
Zones in Southern Nations, Nationalities, and Peoples' Region